M. A. Matin is a Bangladeshi politician and the incumbent Jatiya Sangsad member representing the Kurigram-3 constituency.

Career
Matin was elected to parliament from Kurigram-3 as a Bangladesh Awami League candidate on 30 December 2018.

References

Living people
11th Jatiya Sangsad members
Awami League politicians
Place of birth missing (living people)
1956 births